Kai Krüger (born 4 May 1940) is a Norwegian jurist and professor of law at the University of Bergen.

Kai Krüger was born in Copenhagen in Denmark, but moved to Norway when he was six years old. He graduated as cand.jur. from the University of Oslo in 1966. And as dr.juris in 1979 with the dissertation "Særlig om deviasjon i sjøtransport". The same year he was appointed professor of law at the University of Bergen.

Krügers main work "Norsk kontraktsrett" was finished in 1989, and he received the Meltzers award for this book and his other scholarly activity at the University of Bergen in 1990. In 1994 he became a member of the Norwegian Academy of Science and Letters.

References

1940 births
Living people
Norwegian jurists
University of Oslo alumni
Academic staff of the University of Bergen
Members of the Norwegian Academy of Science and Letters